The quinarius  (plural: quinarii) was a small silver Roman coin valued at half a denarius.

The quinarius was struck for a few years, along with the silver sestertius, following the introduction of the denarius in 211 BC. At this time the quinarius was valued at 5 asses. The coin was reintroduced in 101 BC as a replacement for the victoriatus, this time valued at 8 asses due to retariffing of the denarius to 16 asses in 118 BC. For a few years following its reintroduction, large quantities of quinarii were produced, mostly for circulation in Gaul. The coin was produced sporadically until the 3rd century. Its symbol is 𐆗.

The term gold quinarius or quinarius aureus is used to describe the half-aureus, which is valued at 12.5 denarii. This term has no ancient authority.

References

External links 
 More Information

Coins of ancient Rome
Numismatics